Kempt Tower, in La Grande Cueillette, Saint Ouen, Jersey, is also known as Saint Ouen No. 2 and La Grôsse Tou  in Jèrriais, and is a Martello tower that the British completed in 1834. It is named for Sir James Kempt, the Master-General of the Ordnance from 1830 to 1834. While governor of Canada, Kempt was involved in the planning for the use of Martello towers to protect the colony. Currently, Kempt Tower serves as the interpretation centre for Les Mielles conservation area.

Design
Kempt Tower has a cam-shaped base, and has a trefoil gun platform. It too has a thicker-walled side facing the sea. It is shorter and wider than its near neighbour, Lewis Tower. The interior of the tower is a doughnut-shaped space around a brick column, and has a curved ceiling. The door at ground level represents a modification by the German occupation of the Channel Islands.

The tower itself was armed with a 24-pounder gun and two 24-pounder short guns. In front of the tower there was a paved redoubt that was armed with three 24-pounder guns.

Citations and references
Citations

References
Clements, William H. (1998) Towers of Strength: Story of Martello Towers. (London: Pen & Sword). .
Grimsley, E.J. (1988) The Historical Development of the Martello Tower in the Channel Islands. (Sarnian Publications). 
Sutcliffe, Sheila (1973) Martello Towers. (Cranbury, NJ: Associated Universities Press).

Buildings and structures in Saint Ouen, Jersey
Coastal artillery
Fortifications in Jersey
History of Jersey
Jersey
Towers in Jersey
Martello towers